Lycoming College is a private liberal arts college in Williamsport, Pennsylvania. Founded in 1812, Lycoming College is affiliated with the United Methodist Church but operates as an independent institution. Through its history, it has been an academy, seminary, junior college, and four-year college.

History
Lycoming College traces its roots to 1812 and the founding of the "Williamsport Academy for the Education of Youth in English and other languages, in the useful arts, science and literature". Eight spirited citizens secured the charter for the school and founded the academy to improve the educational opportunities of the community. Attendance was by subscription, although a state grant ensured that a number of underprivileged children would be taught free of charge. The academy was for boys but accepted girls in the 1830s. It was one of the early academics in Pennsylvania which placed it on the frontier of academy-based education in the state.

By 1847, Williamsport had a public school system in place. Benjamin H. Crever, a Methodist preacher based in Milton, heard the academy was for sale. Upon his recommendation, the Baltimore Conference purchased the school, which opened in the fall of 1848 as the Williamsport Dickinson Seminary, a preparatory school for Dickinson College, another Methodist school.

Rev. Crever is considered to be the founder of Lycoming College, as he was the one to transition the high school into its collegiate beginnings. After turning the Williamsport Academy into an institution of higher learning, Crever moved on to serve as a chaplain in the Civil War and founded a total of four schools. Only Lycoming College remains as his educational legacy.

In 1921, John W. Long became the ninth president of the school. A pastor at St. Paul's Methodist Church in State College and founder of the Wesley Foundation at Pennsylvania State College, now Penn State University, he had pastoral experience and working with students. He became president of three institutions without moving. He transformed Williamsport Dickinson Seminary into Williamsport Dickinson Seminary and Junior College in 1929. It was the first private junior college in the state and another frontier in higher education in America.

In 1947, the school became Lycoming College, a four-year school. The college adopted the name "Lycoming" in 1948, a Native American word for a nearby stream which means "sandy stream" and the name of the county. These changes came with substantial support from the college's board of trustees and the local community. In 1949, the college conferred its first baccalaureate degrees.

James E. Douthat became the 14th president in 1989. Under his leadership, the college's enrollment grew by 27 percent and its endowment and other funds under management increased from $17 million to more than $185 million. Since his arrival, the campus had been involved in a strategic planning process to continually evaluate student needs and adapt the College's programs to those needs. Under his leadership, the college saw the establishment and implementation of a new faculty governance structure, a major capital campaign to build the endowment, improved facilities, and the adoption of a revised curriculum for the college that responds to changing skill set needs.

Kent C. Trachte became Lycoming's 15th president in 2013. He has continued many of the important themes of his predecessor, including working closely with the board of trustees and the faculty. He launched a new long-range planning effort, many of its goals achieved. The college is now into another long-range planning era. He presided over the completion of the Lynn Science Center, generated interest in and led the construction of the Krapf Gateway Center as the new entrance of the campus, and the construction of a new music practice building slated to open in the fall of 2022. He has led the college in a new campus-community project to revitalize the Old Town section of Williamsport and he has led the college in a major effort to open its doors to students more representative of a diverse American society.

Rankings 
Lycoming was ranked 120th among "National Liberal Arts Colleges" in 2021 U.S. News & World Report, and 29th in Social Mobility. It is listed as a "Best College" in The Princeton Review's Best 387 Colleges for 2021 and 61st by Washington Monthly in 2020.

Academics
Lycoming College confers both Bachelor of Arts and Bachelor of Science degrees in more than 43 major fields of study offered and more than 66 minors.

Interdisciplinary program

With the Lycoming College interdisciplinary program, students have the opportunity to design their own programs of study. By combining courses from more than one department, students become active participants in creating their own majors with support from faculty advisor(s) and a panel of faculty members from each of the sponsoring departments.

Special academic programs

The Lycoming Scholars Program is a special program designed to meet the needs and aspirations of highly motivated students of superior intellectual ability. Lycoming Scholars participate in special, semester-long, interdisciplinary seminars on topics chosen by the faculty and students on the Scholars Council.

Pre-professional programs including pre-law, pre-med, pre-vet, and pre-ministry provide students with advisors who ensure students take the right courses to prepare for graduate school and success in these professions.

Lycoming's MBA 4-1 agreement with the Saunders College Business at Rochester Institute of Technology allows students to opt out of some graduate-level courses, saving on tuition costs and completing their MBA in one calendar year.

An engineering 3-2 partnership with the prestigious Watson School of Engineering at Binghamton University allows students to spend their first three years building foundational knowledge at Lycoming and a final two years completing an electrical or industrial engineering degree at Binghamton.

Campus

Lycoming College rests on a 42-acre campus in north central Pennsylvania. Most buildings have been constructed since 1950 in a pre-Georgian style, and many have been refurbished since. The most recently constructed buildings include the Lynn Science Center (2015), adjacently connected to the Heim Science Center and holding the Detwiler Planetarium, and the Krapf Gateway Center (2019) which houses the Office of Admissions, Office of Alumni and Advancement, the Center for Enhanced Academic Experiences, and the Outdoor Leadership and Education program.
Lycoming's academic facilities include Wendle Hall, the Academic Center, Fine Arts Building, Communications Building, Heim Science Center, Clarke Chapel, Mary Lindsay Welch Honors Hall, and the Lynn Science Center.

Unique facilities include the Detwiler Planetarium, Mary L. Welch Theatre, Snowden Library, the Sylk Digital Arts Laboratory, an electronic music studio, a radio station, and a greenhouse.

Athletic facilities include Lamade Gymnasium, the Keiper Recreation Center, and an outdoor intramural field. The 12-acre Shangraw Athletic Complex lies a few blocks north of the main campus with football and softball fields as well as the UPMC Field for soccer and lacrosse.

The Lycoming College Art Gallery is located at 25 West Fourth Street in downtown Williamsport. Additionally, the Lycoming Biology Field Station Inc., a nonprofit corporation and wholly-owned subsidiary of Lycoming College, sits on 116 acres of land just 15 minutes from campus, which is frequently used by the biology department and the Clean Water Institute.

Athletics
Today, Lycoming fields men's and women's teams in basketball, cross country, lacrosse, soccer, swimming, and tennis, men's teams in baseball, football, golf, and wrestling, and women's teams in field hockey, softball, and volleyball. Lycoming is currently a member in the Middle Atlantic Conferences, with the baseball, basketball, field hockey, lacrosse, soccer, tennis, golf, softball, and volleyball teams competing in the MAC Freedom. The athletic department has accepted an invitation to move 18 of its 19 sports to the Landmark Conference, starting in 2023-24. 

The Warriors have won 43 Middle Atlantic Conference titles, with football and wrestling winning 15 each, men's basketball six, men's soccer three, women's swimming and volleyball two, and men's tennis and softball one.

Lycoming College celebrated its 125th year of varsity athletics in 2015, as a baseball team was first formed at Dickinson Seminary in 1890. In 1952, Lycoming, recently becoming an established four-year college, was invited to join the Middle Atlantic Conference.

The football team had a period where it was one of the most competitive in Division III football, as College Football Hall of Fame head coach Frank Girardi won 257 games from 1972 to 2007, which still ranks 16th all-time in NCAA history. He led the Warriors to the national title game in 1990 and 1997 and the semifinals in 1996.

Residential living 
Lycoming College is a residential campus that requires students to live in campus housing, with a few exceptions including local students who are able to commute from home. The college offers numerous housing options, including eight residence halls: Skeath, Asbury, East, Wesley, Rich, Williams, Crever, and Forest, as well as the Douthat Commons student apartments. several College-owned apartments. They can also choose to live in several different College-owned apartment buildings adjacent to campus.

Dining options include Wertz Dining Hall open seven days a week for breakfast, lunch, and dinner. Café 1812 and the Gateway Café offer breakfast and lunch five days a week, and Jack's Corner offers a late night bite to eat. The college serves its own Warrior Coffee through Lycoming's Warrior Coffee Project, an interdisciplinary program that collaborates with people of the El Naranjito region in the Dominican Republic. The academic buildings with computer labs and printers are open to students 24/7.

Students at Lycoming enjoy the long-established on-campus traditions the college offers. This includes Thanksgiving dinner served family-style by faculty and staff and a Late Night Breakfast served by faculty and staff during finals week.

Notable alumni
David G. Argall '80 – Pennsylvania House of Representatives (1984–2009), Pennsylvania State Senate (2009 to present)
Larry A. Barretta '87 – Arena Football League player
Joseph McCrum Belford (1868) – United States House of Representatives (1897–1899) from New York
P. Kevin Brobson '92 - Pennsylvania Supreme Court Judge
Deirdre P. Connelly '83 – Pharmaceuticals executive, Forbes 2009 list of World's 100 Most Powerful Women
David Albaugh De Armond (1865) – United States House of Representatives (1891–1909) from Missouri
Thomas W. Dempsey '52 – Pennsylvania House of Representatives (1987–2000); recipient of 2001 Angela R. Kyte Outstanding Alumnus Award
Gene L. Dodaro '73 – Comptroller General of the United States since 2008
Robert W. Edgar '65 – President and CEO of Common Cause, a nonpartisan government watchdog organization
Rusty E. Fricke '87 – Arena Football League player
Ismael Gaspar-Martins '66 - Ambassador Extraordinary and Plenipotentiary, The Republic of Angola
Milton E. Graff – Major League Baseball player (1957–1958) for the Kansas City Athletics
Carl Grivner '75 - CEO of Colt Technologies
Jim Hebe '71 - Retired CEO of Freighliner
Ruth E. (Perry) Hodge  '58 – Retired archivist, U.S. Army and Pennsylvania State Archives, and author, Guide to African American Resources at the Pennsylvania State Archives (Pennsylvania Historical and Museum Commission, 2000)
James Hall Huling (1861) – United States House of Representatives (1895 to 1897) from West Virginia
John C. Jopson '76 – Film and music video director
Alexander Brown Mackie (1915) – Co-founder of Brown Mackie College
Tom A. Marino '85 – U.S. Representative for Pennsylvania's 10th congressional district
Casey Martindale '17 - Emmy-winning documentary film editor
Henry Clay McCormick (1861) – United States House of Representatives (1887–1891) from Pennsylvania
Alexander McDonald (1849) – United States Senate (1868–1871) from Arkansas
James Monroe Miller (1875) – United States House of Representatives (1899–1911) from Kansas
Rafael Moreno Valle Rosas '91 – Governor of the Mexican state of Puebla
Peter D. Onorati '75 – Veteran actor
James H. Osmer (1858) – United States House of Representatives (1879–1881) from Pennsylvania
Harry F. Perretta '78 – Head Women's Basketball Coach at Villanova University, Inducted to Lycoming Athletic Hall of Fame in 2007
Charles Emory Patton (1878) – United States House of Representatives (1911–1915) from Pennsylvania
Robert Fleming Rich (1903) – United States House of Representatives (1945–1951) from Pennsylvania
David Schoch '73 - Retired CEO, Ford China
Stan Sloter '80 - President, Paradigm Companies
J. Richard Stamm '76 - Retired Vice-Chairman Global Tax Leader, PriceWaterhouseCoopers International, and Vice President and Chief Financial Officer, STAMM Development Group
Joseph Tanfani Jr. '79 - Pulitzer Prize Winning Journalist
Alicia (Klosowski) Tillman '75 - Chief Marketing Officer, Capitolis
Dr. Marina N. Vernalis '73 - Executive Medical Director, Integrative Cardiac Health Project, Walter Reed Army Medical Center
Milton George Urner (1856) – United States House of Representatives (1879–1883) from Maryland
Thomas I. Vanaskie '75 – United States circuit judge on the United States Court of Appeals for the Third Circuit
Tom H. Woodruff Jr. '80 – Oscar-winning special effects supervisor
Gene Yaw '70 – Pennsylvania State Senator representing the 23rd Senatorial District
Dick (Robert) Yuengling '66 - fifth-generation owner of D.G. Yuengling & Son, turned his family's struggling brewery into one of America's largest beer makers, recipient of 2016 Dr. James E. Douthat Outstanding Achievement Award
Ingrid Zhang '94 - President, Novartis Pharmaceuticals (China)

References

External links

Official website

 
Educational institutions established in 1812
Liberal arts colleges in Pennsylvania
Universities and colleges in Lycoming County, Pennsylvania
Buildings and structures in Williamsport, Pennsylvania
1812 establishments in Pennsylvania
Private universities and colleges in Pennsylvania